Ilıncak is a village in the Sivrice District of Elazığ Province in Turkey. The village had a population of 43 in 2021.

References

Villages in Sivrice District